Streptomyces pluricolorescens is a bacterium species from the genus of Streptomyces which has been isolated from soil in Japan. Streptomyces pluricolorescens produces chrothiomycin, pluramycin A and pluramycin B.

See also 
 List of Streptomyces species

References

Further reading

External links
Type strain of Streptomyces pluricolorescens at BacDive -  the Bacterial Diversity Metadatabase

plumbiresistens
Bacteria described in 1961